War and Remembrance is an American miniseries based on the 1978 novel of the same name written by Herman Wouk. The miniseries, which aired from November 13, 1988, to May 14, 1989, covers the period of World War II from the American entry into World War II immediately after Pearl Harbor in December 1941 to the day after the bombing of the Japanese city of Hiroshima. It is the sequel to the 1983 miniseries The Winds of War, which was also based on one of Wouk's novels.

Plot
The television mini-series continues the story of the extended Henry family and the Jastrow family starting on December 15, 1941 and ending on August 7, 1945 and their life experiences during World War II.

Cast

 Robert Mitchum as Capt. Victor "Pug" Henry
 Jane Seymour as Natalie Henry
 Hart Bochner as Byron Henry
 Victoria Tennant as Pamela Tudsbury
 Brian Werner as Naval Aviator (acting debut) 
 Polly Bergen as Rhoda Henry
 Sharon Stone as Janice Henry
 Sami Frey as Avram Rabinovitz
 William Schallert as Harry Hopkins
 Jeremy Kemp as Brig. Gen. Armin von Roon
 Steven Berkoff as Adolf Hitler
 Robert Hardy as Winston Churchill
 Zevi Wolmark as John Simms
 Topol as Berel Jastrow
 Ralph Bellamy as Franklin D. Roosevelt
 John Gielgud as Aaron Jastrow
 David Dukes as Leslie Slote
 E. G. Marshall as Dwight D. Eisenhower
 Barry Bostwick as Carter "Lady" Aster
 Ian McShane as Philip Rule
 John Rhys-Davies as Sammy Mutterperl
 Robert Morley as Alistair Tudsbury
 Peter Graves as Palmer Kirby
 Hardy Krüger as Field Marshal Erwin Rommel
 Bill Wallis as Werner Beck
 Michael Woods as Warren Henry
 Robert Stephens as SS Major Karl Rahm
 Peter Vaughan as General Kurt Zeitzler
 Barry Morse as Col. Gen. Franz Halder
 Leslie Hope as Madeline Henry
 Eddie Albert as Breckinridge Long
 Sky du Mont as Claus Schenk Graf von Stauffenberg
 Richard Dysart as Harry S. Truman
 Lawrence Dobkin as General George S. Patton
 John Dehner as Admiral Ernest King
 Pat Hingle as Admiral William "Bull" Halsey
 William Prince as Admiral Chester W. Nimitz
 Mike Connors as Col. Harrison "Hack" Peters
 G. D. Spradlin as Admiral Raymond A. Spruance
 Brian Blessed as General Yevlenko
 Howard Duff as William Tuttle
 G. W. Bailey as Commander Jim Grigg
 R. G. Armstrong as General 'Moose' Fitzgerald
 Charles Lane as Admiral William Standley
 Norman Burton as General George Marshall
 Nina Foch as Comtesse de Chambrun
 Günther Maria Halmer (de) as SS Lt. Colonel Rudolf Höss
 Milton Johns as SS Lt. Colonel Adolf Eichmann
 Wolfgang Reichmann as Martin Bormann
 Geoffrey Whitehead as Albert Speer 
 John Malcolm as Field Marshal Wilhelm Keitel
 Wolfgang Preiss as Field Marshal Walter von Brauchitsch
 Anthony Bate as Field Marshal Gerd von Rundstedt
 Kenneth Colley as SS Colonel Paul Blobel 
 Clifford Rose as SS Lt. General Heinz Kammler 
 Wolf Kahler as SS Major Anton Burger
 Michael Sarne as SS Captain Schwarz
 Velimir Bata Živojinović as Jewish partisan leader
 William Berger as Consul General Jim Gaither
 John Barrard as Oskar Friedman
 Jack Ging as Commander William Buracker
 Michael Madsen as Lt. 'Foof' Turhall
 William R. Moses as Lt. Cdr. Simon Anderson
 Rade Marković as SS Captain (Theresienstadt) (uncredited) (Episode 7)
 Demeter Bitenc as SS Captain (Train to Auschwitz)  (uncredited) (Episode 11)
 Nikola Gec as SS Guard (Ukraine) (uncredited) (Episode 7)
 Zdenko Jelčić as SS Sergeant (Ukraine) (uncredited) (Episode 7)
 Zvonimir Torjanac as Danish Red Cross Member (uncredited) (Episode 9)

Production

Development

War and Remembrance had a multi-year production timeline. It was, at the time, the most expensive single project in the history of filmed entertainment and the most expensive single-story undertaking in United States television history. Costing $104 million ($253 million in 2021 dollars), it took over ABC's broadcast schedule for two one-week periods in 1988 and 1989, totaling 30 prime-time hours.

Up to that point, television had been dominated by the Big Three broadcasting networks in the United States, ABC, NBC and CBS. Shortly afterwards, cable television began the fragmentation of the United States broadcasting audience in earnest, leaving War and Remembrance the last of the giant miniseries. Miniseries had been major events on American television and ABC had produced some of the most seminal, under its ABC Novels for Television banner, including QB VII, Rich Man, Poor Man, Roots, Roots: The Next Generations, and Masada.

Because Herman Wouk was happy with Dan Curtis's 1983 ABC Novel for Television adaptation of The Winds of War, Wouk allowed Curtis to adapt the sequel novel as well. Curtis turned the project down at first, however. He feared it would be impossible to accomplish, even with virtually unlimited resources. Curtis worried that the massive naval battles could not be recreated, because so few WWII-era ships and planes still existed. More importantly, Curtis, who was Jewish, wondered how to do justice to the reality of the Holocaust, saying "to put on film the true horror was impossible. Once one false note sneaks in, you're gone. And, in my own eyes, I felt failing would be an absolute crime." Curtis credited his wife Norma with convincing him to take on the mammoth job, recounting that she told him "You'll kill yourself if someone else finishes this story."

Paramount Television had produced The Winds of War at a cost of $40 million, $32 million of which was covered by ABC's licensing fee. However, Paramount decided not to produce the sequel and sold the rights to ABC, which produced the massive miniseries itself. ABC first planned a $65 million, 20-hour series, but when they went to Curtis, he said he wanted to make a $100 million, 30-hour series, which they eventually greenlit. There were also strict contractual restrictions on advertising that Herman Wouk had negotiated in 1977, before either miniseries aired. He had approval over all ads and required them not to disturb the narrative or to run under 30 seconds. Wouk also refused to allow any advertising for personal care products, foods, or any other ABC programming. Major eventual sponsors were Ford Motors, Nike, IBM, GE and American Express. In addition, Wouk required that certain Holocaust sequences run uninterrupted by commercials of any kind. ABC's standards and practices division also agreed to an unprecedented waiver allowing frontal nudity during the lengthy Holocaust sequences, running parental advisories before any episodes beginning before 8pm.

The screenplay took two years to write. While Wouk wrote the script for The Winds of War alone, for War and Remembrance Curtis and Earl W. Wallace wrote the dramatic scenes dealing with the fictional Henry family, while Wouk wrote the scenes involving historical figures.  The series was nearly called off in 1985, just as it was nearing the completion of $16 million in preproduction, when ABC was bought by Capital Cities Communications, which instituted a thrifty executive direction.

Casting
Although most of the enormous cast of The Winds of War returned to their roles in War and Remembrance, including Robert Mitchum, Victoria Tennant, Polly Bergen and Jeremy Kemp, several roles were recast. John Houseman, who played Aaron Jastrow in Winds of War, was too frail for War and Remembrance'''s lengthy production schedule. He died of spinal cancer in 1988, the year War and Remembrance was broadcast. Houseman was replaced by John Gielgud. Jane Seymour was cast as Natalie Henry in place of Ali MacGraw after Seymour campaigned for the role and made a screen test. Dan Curtis was struck by her performance and immediately cast her in the vital role.

Jan-Michael Vincent, who played Byron Henry in The Winds of War, was busy as the action lead in the American television series Airwolf. Cast and crew also hint in more recent interviews in the featurette on the Winds of War DVD that Vincent's drinking made him difficult on set. Vincent was replaced by Hart Bochner. Other major replacements include Sharon Stone as Janice (replacing Deborah Winters), Leslie Hope as Madeline (replacing Lisa Eilbacher), Michael Woods as Warren (replacing Ben Murphy), Robert Morley as Alistair Tudsbury (replacing Michael Logan), Barry Bostwick as Aster (replacing Joseph Hacker), and Steven Berkoff as Adolf Hitler (replacing Günter Meisner). William Woodson again serves as narrator.

Filming

During preproduction, Dan Curtis lobbied the Polish Communist government tirelessly for permission to film on the grounds of the Auschwitz concentration camp, and after two years it was eventually granted, making War and Remembrance the first major commercial motion picture to be filmed there. His request was aided by the intercession of TVP, the public Polish TV network, and the support of Poland's preeminent World War II expert, who approved the script. Curtis said that he was allowed to film at Auschwitz on the condition that the script not have "one word about Polish antisemitism" during the war.

Filming of the miniseries began with production at Auschwitz from January to May 1986. When the Chernobyl nuclear disaster happened nearby, causing legitimate fears of fallout spreading across Scandinavia and Eastern Europe, Curtis called in nuclear scientists from the International Atomic Energy Agency in Vienna to give the location a clean bill of health, but allowed any crew members who were still afraid to wait in Munich for the production to return. The crematoriums were rebuilt adjacent to the original site, from the original German blueprints, because they had been demolished by the Nazis at the end of the war.

Because the miniseries was being shot out of sequence, Jane Seymour's long hair could not be cut for the scenes at Auschwitz, which were the very first she filmed. Instead, make-up artists took shears to a full scalp wig for her to wear for those scenes instead. Both Curtis and Seymour contracted pneumonia in the brutal sub-zero temperatures there  and the production had to briefly shut down as a result. Several actual Auschwitz-Birkenau survivors were cast as extras for the Auschwitz-Birkenau selection sequence and former Auschwitz internee Branko Lustig, later a two-time Oscar-winning producer, served as assistant director on the series.

Filmed from January 1986 to September 1987, the 1,492 page script (by Earl W. Wallace, Dan Curtis, and Herman Wouk) contained 2,070 scenes. There were 757 sets: 494 in Europe, including France, Italy, Austria, Yugoslavia, Switzerland, West Germany, England, and Poland, and 263 in the United States (including Hawaii) and Canada.  There were 358 speaking parts in the script; 30,310 extras were employed in Europe and 11,410 in the United States. The gargantuan production was filmed in a series of seven 13-week shooting blocks, after each of which it would shut down for a month to do preliminary work for the next 13-week shoot.

The series was shot in Yugoslavia in Zagreb and Osijek, where the old town district of Tvrđa, a Habsburg star-shaped fortress, was used as a primary location, doubling for the almost identical fortress town of Theresienstadt, in Czechoslovakia, which was converted by the Nazis to a Jewish ghetto. Filming took place in France throughout Paris, including the Paris Opera, where a scene from The Marriage of Figaro was staged with a 42-piece symphony orchestra and 500 extras, and Lourdes, where the production took over the Sanctuary of Our Lady of Lourdes; in West Germany in Baden-Baden and Berchtesgaden, where members of the United States Army, stationed nearby were hired as extras for some of the scenes shot at Hitler's Eagle's Nest; in Rome and Siena, Italy; Bern, Switzerland; London and Cambridge, England; and Vienna, Austria. Scenes set in Russia were filmed in Montreal in temperatures reaching 40 degrees below zero Celsius. In addition, miniatures for the sea battles were filmed in the water tank of the 007 Stage at Pinewood Studios in the UK.

In the US, the production shot extensively in and around Los Angeles. Filming also took place in Washington, D.C.; at the United States Naval Academy in Annapolis, Maryland; at Long Beach Naval Station in Long Beach, California aboard ; in Bremerton, Washington; at Naval Air Station Pensacola in Pensacola, Florida aboard the aircraft carrier ; in Mobile, Alabama, aboard ; and throughout Hawaii, including Pearl Harbor aboard  and Waianae, where a large group of warships were assembled.

After principal photography was completed, a wrap party for cast and crew was held on January 8, 1988 aboard the ocean liner  in Long Beach, which had previously been used as a filming location for The Winds of War.

Episodes

Broadcast
The scope of the production had required it to be greenlit years in advance. By 1988, network viewership had shrunk to just 68 percent of television viewers. As a result, by the time the series aired, it was never expected to earn a profit. ABC stated that they fully expected to lose at least $20 million on it. The miniseries was originally intended to run on consecutive nights in January 1989, but the 1988 Writers Guild of America strike caused ABC to move the first half, chapters I–VII, up to air in the fall of 1988. The strike raised ABC's ratings hopes, because it meant that the series would run without any other original programming opposite it on the other networks. However, when they were broadcast in November 1988, the first seven episodes no longer aired on consecutive nights, as originally planned, running instead spread out over eleven days.

Although the miniseries won every time slot against its competition on NBC and CBS, and outperformed ABC's regular programming, it still underperformed ABC's ratings expectations, with the first chapter averaging an 18.6 Nielsen rating and a 29% viewer share. Because the ratings were lower than ABC had promised the various sponsors, the network was obligated to give additional free "make-good" advertising time to them. The low ratings were also reported to be partly responsible for ABC entertainment head Brandon Stoddard losing his job in April 1989. Dan Curtis blamed the lower-than-expected ratings partly on the confusing airdates, saying in a 2002 interview that ABC "skipped Saturdays and Mondays, the viewers lost the thread, and they didn't even put up a sign saying 'To Be Continued' at the end of the first half." In addition, because the editing schedule was so compressed, ABC allowed Curtis to turn in episodes of enormously varying length, running anywhere from two to three hours with commercials, often with odd running times like two hours and five minutes or two hours and twenty minutes. As a result, the episodes had extremely inconsistent start and end times each night they ran. NBC mocked ABC's airing strategy in a promo for their November sweeps programming, comparing their schedule of various regular series, television premieres of acquired films, the Vanna White telefilm Goddess of Love and a Comedy Store special against ABC's "eighteen hours of a war story that doesn't end."

Due to the lower than expected ratings for the first half, the second half, chapters VIII–XII (marketed by ABC as "The Final Chapter"), had several hours cut before airing. The second half was also mixed and aired in mono, instead of the stereo used on the first half. This was not a cost-cutting measure, but the result of a technical issue encountered with airing the stereo mix on the first half.

With the series costing $105 million to produce, Capital Cities/ABC lost an estimated $30-$40 million on the production. This began the downfall of the miniseries, where the format faced decreasing lengths and ratings into the mid-1990s as a result of increasing VCR ownership and cable television; by the 1996–1997 season, the longest-running network miniseries airing was a six-hour adaptation of The Shining (1996).

AwardsWar and Remembrance'' received 15 Emmy Award nominations, including best actor (John Gielgud), actress (Jane Seymour) and supporting actress (Polly Bergen)), and won for best miniseries, special effects and single-camera production editing. It also won three Golden Globes, receiving trophies for Best Miniseries, as well as two awards for John Gielgud and Barry Bostwick, who tied for Best Supporting Actor.

References

External links

 
 
 War and Remembrance television film trailer at YouTube

1980s American television miniseries
American biographical series
Films based on works by Herman Wouk
American Broadcasting Company original programming
Best Miniseries or Television Movie Golden Globe winners
Cultural depictions of Adolf Hitler
Cultural depictions of Winston Churchill
English-language television shows
Films directed by Dan Curtis
Television series set in the 1940s
Holocaust films
Films shot at Pinewood Studios
Primetime Emmy Award for Outstanding Miniseries winners
Television shows based on American novels
Television series by Disney–ABC Domestic Television
Television series produced at Pinewood Studios
American World War II films
World War II television drama series
World War II television series
Works about women in war
Television series set in 1941
Television series set in 1942
Television series set in 1943
Television series set in 1944
Television series set in 1945
Japan in non-Japanese culture
Television shows about the atomic bombings of Hiroshima and Nagasaki